Austropetalia tonyana is a species of dragonfly of the family Austropetaliidae, 
commonly known as the alpine redspot. 
It is endemic to mountain areas of Victoria and New South Wales, Australia, where it inhabits trickles, sphagnum moss swamps and waterfall splash zones.
It is a medium-sized dragonfly with brown and yellow markings.

Gallery

See also
 List of Odonata species of Australia

References

Austropetaliidae
Odonata of Australia
Insects of Australia
Endemic fauna of Australia
Taxa named by Günther Theischinger
Insects described in 1995